Russe may refer to:
 Ruse, Bulgaria, a city
 Russian language, the official language in Russia
 Luke Russe,  an English professional footballer
 Charlotte Russe (clothing retailer)